D. grandis may refer to:
 Daemonorops grandis, a rattan palm species found in Asia
 Daldinia grandis, a fungus species in the genus Daldinia
 Deinodon grandis, a nomen dubium (may refer to Ornithomimus grandis or Aublysodon grandis)
 Dendropanax grandis, a tree species in the genus Dendropanax found in the Caribbean
 Dryptosauroides grandis, a dinosaur species found in India that lived during the Late Cretaceous

See also
 Grandis (disambiguation)